Pamela Wallenfels (born 31 May 1971) is a German former professional tennis player.

Wallenfels, a West German World Youth Cup representative, started on the professional tour in the late 1980s. She reached a career high singles ranking of 208 in the world during her career. Her WTA Tour appearances include a first round win over Veronika Martinek at the 1988 Citizen Cup in Hamburg.

Following her professional career she played collegiate tennis for Pepperdine University, from 1992 to 1995.

ITF finals

Singles: 1 (0–1)

References

External links
 
 

1971 births
Living people
West German female tennis players
German female tennis players
Pepperdine Waves women's tennis players